Jacob Andrew Matthews (born February 11, 1992) is an American football offensive tackle for the Atlanta Falcons of the National Football League (NFL). He was drafted by the Falcons sixth overall in the 2014 NFL Draft. He played college football at Texas A&M. He is a member of the Matthews family of football players.

High school career
Matthews attended Elkins High School in Missouri City, where he was a standout offensive lineman for the Elkins Knights high school football team. He was teammates with D. J. Hayden. In his senior season, Matthews was a first-team all-district and all-greater Houston honoree as his team finished the season with a 9–3 record. Matthews was invited to play in the 2010 U.S. Army All-American Bowl and also earned 2009 High School All-American honors by USA Today, Parade, and SuperPrep.

Regarded as a four-star recruit by Rivals.com, he was listed as the No. 7 offensive tackle prospect in the class of 2010. He chose Texas A&M over offers from Oklahoma, Alabama, Arkansas, Oregon, Texas, Texas Tech, Southern California, and Stanford.

College career
As a junior in 2012, Matthews was a first-team All-Southeastern Conference (SEC) selection in recognition of his successful season. He also received first-team All-American honors by the Football Writers Association of America. During his senior season, Matthews played left tackle after playing right tackle for the previous three seasons.

As a senior in 2013, Matthews was again a first-team All-Southeastern Conference (SEC) selection.

Professional career

Matthews was drafted by the Atlanta Falcons with the sixth overall pick in the 2014 NFL Draft. With Luke Joeckel having been selected second overall in the 2013 NFL Draft by the Jacksonville Jaguars, Texas A&M became the first school with consecutive top-10 selected offensive lineman since USC's Tyron Smith and Matt Kalil in 2011 and 2012, respectively.

In his first NFL game, Matthews suffered a high ankle sprain in a season-opening win against the Saints. Despite the injury, Matthews started in all but one game in his rookie season. In 2015, Matthews' blocking improved, allowing only 38 quarterback pressures compared to 51 in 2014. That season, Matthews was named as the third most improved player of 2015 by Pro Football Focus.

In the 2016 season, Matthews and the Falcons reached Super Bowl LI, where they faced the  New England Patriots. In the Super Bowl, Matthews played all offensive snaps, as the Falcons as they fell in a 34–28 overtime defeat.

On April 25, 2017, the Falcons picked up the fifth-year option on Matthews' contract. He started all 16 games at left tackle for the third straight year for the Falcons in 2017.

On July 27, 2018, Matthews signed a five-year, $75 million contract extension with the Falcons.

On January 23, 2019, Matthews was named to his first Pro Bowl as a replacement for Redskins offensive tackle Trent Williams.

During the 2020 season, Matthews played in all 16 games, allowing only three quarterback sacks, six quarterback hits, and three total penalties on 1,113 offensive snaps. For his 2020 performance, he earned a 75.5 overall Pro Football Focus grade, with a 84.0 grade in pass blocking and 57.4 grade in run blocking. His pass blocking ranked 9th among all tackles in the NFL and his run blocking ranked 47th. The 75.5 overall grade was the lowest he received since the 2016 season. Matthews has played at least 1,000 snaps every season since 2015.

On March 14, 2022, Matthews signed a three-year, $52.5 million extension with the Falcons. By the end of November 2022, Matthews started 138 consecutive regular season games, the longest active streak for a left tackle in the NFL.

Personal life

Matthews was born in Missouri City, Texas. He is the son of Pro Football Hall of Famer Bruce Matthews and the younger brother of Kevin Matthews, a center who also played for the Aggies and last played for the Carolina Panthers in 2015. His older brother, Mike, last played center for the Miami Dolphins. He is also the cousin of former linebacker Clay Matthews III, who spent the majority of his career playing for the Green Bay Packers, and Casey Matthews, a linebacker who last played for the Minnesota Vikings. He is the nephew of NFL veteran Clay Matthews Jr., the grandson of NFL veteran Clay Matthews Sr., and the great grandson of H. L. Matthews. He is married to Meggi Matthews.

References

External links

Atlanta Falcons bio

1992 births
Living people
People from Missouri City, Texas
Players of American football from Texas
Sportspeople from Harris County, Texas
All-American college football players
American football offensive tackles
Texas A&M Aggies football players
Atlanta Falcons players
Matthews football family
National Conference Pro Bowl players